In basketball, a free throw is "an opportunity given to a player to score one (1) point, uncontested, from position behind the free throw line and inside the semicircle." The National Collegiate Athletic Association's (NCAA) Division I is the highest level of amateur basketball in the United States. The NCAA did not split into its current divisions format until August 1973. From 1906 to 1955, there were no classifications to the NCAA nor its predecessor, the Intercollegiate Athletic Association of the United States (IAAUS). Then, from 1956 to  spring 1973, colleges were classified as either "NCAA University Division (Major College)" or "NCAA College Division (Small College)".

The all-time leader in NCAA free throws made is Tyler Hansbrough of North Carolina. From 2005–06 through 2008–09, Hansbrough made 982 free throws, surpassing the 54-year-old record of 905 that was held by Wake Forest's Dickie Hemric. While Hansbrough's free throw percentage (79.1%) is better than Hemric's (66.6%), Hemric accomplished the feat in only 104 career games played compared to Hansbrough's 142.

Five players on this list are Naismith Memorial Basketball Hall of Fame inductees: Pete Maravich, Oscar Robertson, Bill Bradley Joe Dumars, and Alonzo Mourning. Some players on this list, such as those whose career games played is below 100, played college basketball during the era before freshmen were allowed to play varsity basketball, and were instead allowed to play freshman or junior varsity basketball only. Their free throw makes and attempts could have been significantly higher had they played an additional season.

George Washington University is the only school that has multiple members on the top 25 all-time free throws made list: Chris Monroe (719) and Joe Holup (714). Only one player in the top 25 split his college career between two different schools. Steve Rogers, who scored 713 free throws between 1988 and 1992, attended Middle Tennessee before transferring to Alabama State.

Key

Top 25 career free throw leaders

References
General

Specific

NCAA Division I men's basketball statistical leaders